Hamlet A.D.D. is a 2014 American independent film and web series directed by Bobby Ciraldo and Andrew Swant and produced by Special Entertainment. It re-imagines William Shakespeare's Hamlet as a bizarre and comical tour through the ages. The world premiere was held at the Los Angeles Museum of Contemporary Art (MOCA LA) in April 2014.

This version of Hamlet is a comedy shot entirely in front of a green screen and features live-action characters in an animated world. The story begins in 1602 and leaps chronologically through time to the present, then into the distant future.

Guest stars include Dustin Diamond (Saved by the Bell), Mark Metcalf (Animal House), Majel Barrett Roddenberry (Star Trek), Trace Beaulieu & Kevin Murphy (Mystery Science Theater 3000), Mark Borchardt & Mike Schank (American Movie), Kumar Pallana (Rushmore), Leslie Hall (Yo Gabba Gabba!), Samwell ("What What"), Tay Zonday (Chocolate Rain), Michael Q. Schmidt (Tim & Eric Awesome Show), and comic Gregg Turkington as his character Neil Hamburger (Tim & Eric Awesome Show).

Scenes from the film have been shown at White Columns gallery (New York City), the Green Gallery (Milwaukee), the Frederick Layton Gallery (MIAD), INOVA gallery (UW-Milwaukee), and appeared as a special feature on the Mystery Science Theater 3000 XV box set. The film was supported by the Mary L. Nohl Fellowship for Artists.

Plot
Hamlet is an easily distracted prince who is not quite ready to do the task at hand. Challenged to kill his uncle Claudius by the ghost of his recently dead father, Hamlet enthusiastically proceeds to do everything but. From practicing stage acting in the 1800s to producing a television drama in the 1950s, from dancing at the discothèque in the 1970s to culinary prankery in the distant future, Hamlet always manages to find something to distract himself from taking revenge for his father's murder.

Cast

References

External links
 
 
 Milwaukee Journal Sentinel article about the film
 Urban Milwaukee interview with the filmmakers

2014 films
2014 comedy films
American comedy films
Films based on Hamlet
2010s American animated films
2010s English-language films